William M. van der Weyde (1871 – 10 July 1929 ), sometime spelled William M. Vander Weyde, was an American photojournalist based in New York City. "His crisp portraits captured the day’s leading writers, poets, and athletes for publications such as Success, Literary Digest, and McClure's magazines."

Van der Weyde started his career during the Spanish–American War. William van der Weyde was married to Katherine MacNamee who was also a photographer.

References

External links
 Photographs on Flickr
 Photographs at The Eastman Museum

1871 births
1929 deaths
American photojournalists
19th-century American photographers
20th-century American photographers